Evansdale is a city in Black Hawk County, Iowa, United States. The population was 4,561 in the 2020 census, an increase from 4,526 in 2000.  It is part of the Waterloo–Cedar Falls Metropolitan Statistical Area.

Geography

Evansdale's longitude and latitude coordinates in decimal form are 42.467837, -92.282105.

Evansdale is a border to border suburb of Waterloo.

History

Evansdale began its existence in 1947, when the residents of the Home Acres and River Forest Area adjoining the east city limits of Waterloo and confronted with a common drainage problem, formed the Home Acres Improvement Association.  In August of that year the Association petitioned for articles of incorporation as a town and presented their documents to District Judge William T. Evans through Parkersburg attorney Dale Van Eman, hence Evansdale.  The poll resulted in a 205-106 favorable count to incorporate. The history of growth in the area can be timed back to the turn of the century.  Situated in East Waterloo Township, Evansdale evolved from several different sections that were developed. Around the turn of the century, William T. Evans owned a farm just south of Watermelon Avenue in what is approximately the present route of Highway 20.  Lafayette Road, an extension of Lafayette Street from Waterloo, cut through the Evans' farm. Just east of Evans' farm was a farm owned by Julia B. Richards.  The County School #1 sat on the corner of Richards' property in what eventually became known as Evans Crossing.  This was the first of the sections which later became Evansdale.

Other large farmers in the area at the time were: Mary C. Crumrine, Jacob Griffith, Samuel R. White, C.C. Wolf, Hugh Newell, Lore Alford, James Gardner, George Shirley, J.H. Johnston, August Westendorf, Frederick Timmermann and Carl Bunger. Another section of land was made up in part by the land owned by C.C. Wolf.  The land was located between what is now Grand Blvd. and the present site of Evans Road. In the early 1900s Wolf built the Elk Run Hotel to be used as a summer resort.  The hotel had a large ballroom and dining room and was well known by the residents of northeast Iowa. Commuter trains of the Illinois Central railroad brought weekend visitors to the resort, which faced the Cedar River.
At that time, Wolf, who was originally from Parkersburg, began to plat lots in the area.  However, his hotel business failed, and in 1928 William Fox formed the Home Acres Land Association and developed the land formerly owned by Wolf and some additional land in Evansdale. Mr. Fox operated an insurance agency in Evansdale for many years.  The Home Acres Land Association was originally headquartered in the Elk Run Hotel. A third section, which was developed prior to the land development by Fox was Casebeer Heights.  Lore Alford, a prominent Waterloo lawyer owned the land at the turn of the century.  He sold the property to Jack Casebeer, a Waterloo restaurant owner.  Casebeer developed the land as a summer resort.
Other sections of Evansdale were developed just prior to 1941 but it was the building boom following the War that created the problems that precipitated the incorporation of the city. Shortly thereafter on November 1, 1947, one-hundred and ten voters turned out to elect the only ticket on the ballot at that time with William Wiltfang as mayor.  The first council meeting was conducted November 24, 1947, in an abandoned chicken house owned by Councilman Boelman.
Since that time, Evansdale's growth has been steady but complicated. With the growth of the city the installation of sewers and water lines were necessary to keep pace with the needs of the community.  Progress was complicated by the introduction of the Urban Renewal program in 1969. However, the program provided for a fresh start for the city with new housing and renovation to give Evansdale a new look.

Government 
Evansdale is administered by a five-member city council and a mayor. One council member is elected from each of Evansdale's four wards, and one is elected at-large. The current mayor is  Doug Faas. Who has served as a former Evansdale City Council member, and also previously served as a board member on the Waterloo Community School Board. His  predecessor was Chad Deutsch. Deutsch was elected in 2007 after unsuccessful attempts in 2001 and 2005 to unseat former Mayor John Mardis, and  served three terms as Mayor.

John Mardis served eight consecutive terms as mayor, which made him the longest serving Evansdale Mayor. In 2007 the city had a budget of $3.8 million and a tax rate of $6.75 per $1000 of taxable property valuation. A new community response center was built to house the police and fire rescue, who were outgrowing their respective areas.

Demographics

2010 census
As of the census of 2010, there were 4,751 people, 1,987 households, and 1,316 families residing in the city. The racial makeup of the city was 94.8% White, 1.7% African American, 0.2% Native American, 0.5% Asian, 0.4% from other races, and 2.4% from two or more races. Hispanic or Latino of any race were 1.7% of the population.

There were 1,987 households, of which 31.2% had children under the age of 18 living with them, 48.1% were married couples living together, 12.6% had a female householder with no husband present, 5.5% had a male householder with no wife present, and 33.8% were non-families. 26.9% of all households were made up of individuals, and 10.5% had someone living alone who was 65 years of age or older. The average household size was 2.39 and the average family size was 2.87.

The median age in the city was 38 years. 23.3% of residents were under the age of 18; 8.5% were between the ages of 18 and 24; 26.2% were from 25 to 44; 27.9% were from 45 to 64; and 13.9% were 65 years of age or older. The gender makeup of the city was 48.9% male and 51.1% female.

2000 census
As of the census of 2000, there were 4,526 people, 1,822 households, and 1,260 families residing in the city. The racial makeup of the city was 96.44% White, 0.77% African American, 0.18% Native American, 0.55% Asian, 0.07% Pacific Islander, 0.33% from other races, and 1.66% from two or more races. Hispanic or Latino of any race were 0.93% of the population.

There were 1,822 households, out of which 32.6% had children under the age of 18 living with them, 52.1% were married couples living together, 12.9% had a female householder with no husband present, and 30.8% were non-families. 26.0% of all households were made up of individuals, and 12.0% had someone living alone who was 65 years of age or older. The average household size was 2.48 and the average family size was 2.95.

Age spread: 25.5% under the age of 18, 10.2% from 18 to 24, 26.7% from 25 to 44, 24.4% from 45 to 64, and 13.2% who were 65 years of age or older. The median age was 36 years. For every 100 females, there were 97.4 males. For every 100 females age 18 and over, there were 91.0 males.

The median income for a household in the city was $31,160, and the median income for a family was $37,418. Males had a median income of $29,847 versus $20,434 for females. The per capita income for the city was $15,363. About 10.2% of families and 12.0% of the population were below the poverty line, including 19.5% of those under age 18 and 11.3% of those age 65 or over.

Parks and recreation
Located in Evansdale is a trailhead for the Cedar Valley Nature Trail.

Education
Evansdale children attend the Waterloo Community School District.

Schools in Evansdale:
 Bunger Middle School
 Poyner Elementary School - Located on the site of the former St. Nicholas Catholic Church.

See also

Interstate 380
U.S. Route 20

References

External links

Official City Website
City Data Comprehensive Statistical Data and more about Evansdale, Iowa

Cities in Black Hawk County, Iowa
Cities in Iowa
Waterloo – Cedar Falls metropolitan area
1947 establishments in Iowa